Till Death Do Us Part, Til Death Do Us Part or Till Death Us Do Part is a well-known phrase from the marriage liturgy in the Book of Common Prayer.

The phrase may also refer to:

Films
 Til Death Do Us Part (film), 2017 American psychological thriller film
 Death Do Us Part, 2014 Canadian horror film.
 Till Death Do Us Part (film), 1959 Australian television play
 Till Death Us Do Part (film), 1969 film based on the BBC television series Till Death Us Do Part

Music

Albums
 Till Death Do Us Part (Cypress Hill album), 2004
 Till Death Do Us Part (Deicide album), 2008
 Till Death Do Us Part (Geto Boys album), 1993

Songs
 "Until Death Do Us Part" (song), translation by James Campbell of "Je l'aime à mourir" by Francis Cabrel
 "Till Death Do Us Part", a song by Belladonna on the album The Noir Album
 "Til Death Do Us Part," a song by The Kinks from The Great Lost Kinks Album
 "Till Death Do Us Part", a song by Madonna on the album Like a Prayer
 "Till Death Do Us Part", a song by White Lion on the album Mane Attraction
  "Til Death Do Us Part", a song by Mötley Crüe on the album Motley Crue

Publications
 Till Death Do Us Part (McDaniel novel), by Lurlene McDaniel, 1997
 Till Death Do Us Part (Carr novel), by John Dickson Carr, 1944
 Until Death Do Us Part (manga), a 2005 manga series
 Till Death Us Do Part: A True Murder Mystery, a 1978 book by Vincent Bugliosi

Television

Series 
 Til Death Do Us Part (American TV series), a Court TV series
 Til Death Do Us Part (Philippine TV series), a Filipino 2005 primetime drama series
 'Til Death Do Us Part: Carmen and Dave, an MTV series
 Till Death Us Do Part, a UK TV series

Episodes 
 "Till Death Do Us Part", The A-Team, season 1
 "Till Death Do Us Part", an episode of X-Men: The Animated Series
 "Till Death Do Us Part" Diagnosis: Murder, season 6
 "'Til Death Do Us Part" (Star Trek: Deep Space Nine)
 "Till Death Do Us Part", Castle, season 4
 "Till Death Do Us Part" (NCIS)
 "Till Death Do Us Part", NCIS: Los Angeles
 "Till Death Do Us Part" (Pretty Little Liars)
 "Til Death Do Us Part", Thriller
 "Til Death Do Us Part", Harley Quinn
"Til Death Do Us Part", Siren
 Til Death Do Us Part", Married at First Sight, season 4

See also
 Marriage vows
 Til Death (disambiguation)
 Big Brother: 'Til Death Do You Part, season 9 of the American edition of Big Brother
 "Hasta que la muerte nos separe", a film short in the 2014 Argentine anthology Wild Tales
 Till Deaf Do Us Part, an album by Slade
 "Till Death Do Us Apart", a song by Arven on the album Music of Light
 Till Death Do Us Party, an album by Adore Delano